The following table contains the monthly historical exchange rate of the different currencies of Argentina, expressed in Argentine currency units per United States dollar. The exchange rate at the end of each month is expressed in:
From January 1914 to December 1969: Pesos Moneda Nacional
From January 1970 to May 1983: Pesos Ley 18188
From June 1983 to May 1985: Peso Argentino
From June 1985 to December 1991: Australes
From January 1992: pesos

The value of one current peso is 10,000,000,000,000 (trillion) pesos moneda nacional (m$n), the currency in use from 1881 to 1969. 

It's also equal, as of year-end 2022, to 780 trillion 1914 pesos with the U.S. dollar as reference  an average annual depreciation relative to the dollar of 27% (i.e. an annual increase of the value of the dollar of 37%).

See also

 Table of historical exchange rates
 Economic history of Argentina
 Latin American debt crisis
 La Década Perdida (The Lost Decade; the 1980s)
 Argentine monetary crisis

Sources 
 Información Económica al Día: Dinero y Bancos, Ministerio de Economía de la República Argentina average monthly exchange rates

External links
 BCRA – Banco Central de la República Argentina 

Economic history of Argentina